Adam Kolasa (born 2 August 1975 in Gdańsk, Pomorskie) is a retired Polish pole vaulter.

He finished eighth at the 2001 World Championships in Edmonton in a personal best of 5.75 metres, won the 2001 Jeux de la Francophonie, finished fourth at the 2002 European Indoor Championships in Vienna and ninth at the 2003 World Championships in Paris. Participating at the 2004 Olympics, he failed to qualify from his pool.

His older brothers, Marian and Ryszard, were also pole vaulters.

Major competitions record

External links

External links 
 
 
 
 

1975 births
Living people
Polish male pole vaulters
Athletes (track and field) at the 2004 Summer Olympics
Olympic athletes of Poland
Sportspeople from Gdańsk
Lechia Gdańsk athletes